Isotrias is a genus of moths belonging to the family Tortricidae.

Species
Isotrias buckwelli  Lucas, 1954
Isotrias cuencana  Kennel, 1899
Isotrias huemeri  Trematerra, 1993
Isotrias hybridana  (Hübner, 1817) 
Isotrias joannisana  Turati, 1921
Isotrias martelliana  Trematerra, 1990
Isotrias penedana Trematerra, 2013
Isotrias rectifasciana  (Haworth, 1811) 
Isotrias stramentana  Guenee, 1845

References

 , 2005: World Catalogue of Insects volume 5 Tortricidae.
 , 1895, Handbook of British Lepidoptera: 542.

External links
tortricidae.com

Polyorthini
Tortricidae genera
Taxa named by Edward Meyrick